Roger-Pol Droit (born 1949) is a French academic and philosopher. Alumnus of the École normale supérieure de Saint-Cloud, he has written numerous books, most notably 101 Experiments in the Philosophy of Everyday Life, which has been translated into twenty-two languages. For 25 years, he has studied the way the East is seen in Western philosophy.

Selected bibliography
 Le sens des limites, with Monique Atlan. Éditions de l'Observatoire, 2021.
 Une brève histoire de la philosophie. Flammarion, 2008
 Votre vie sera parfaite, Gourous et charlatans. Odile Jacob, 2005.
 L'oubli de l'Inde, une amnésie philosophique. Presses universitaires de France, 1989. Re-published by Le Seuil, "Points" series, Paris, 2004.
 Le culte du néant, les philosophes et le Bouddha. Seuil, 1997. Re-published in the "Points" series, Paris, 2004.
 La philosophie expliquée à ma fille. Seuil, 2004.
 Dernières nouvelles des choses, Une expérience philosophique. Odile Jacob, 2003.
 101 expériences de philosophie quotidienne. Odile Jacob, 2001 (France Télévision 2001 Essay Prize).
 Les religions expliquées à ma fille. Seuil, 2000.
 "The Confusion of Ideas". Telos 98 (Winter 1993-94). New York: Telos Press

External links 
 Roger-Pol Droit's official website

Further reading
 Interview with Michel Foucault on the Role of Prisons, 5 August 1975

1949 births
21st-century French philosophers
Philosophers of culture
ENS Fontenay-Saint-Cloud-Lyon alumni
Living people
French male non-fiction writers